

Æthelwold (or Æthelweald; died 830) was a medieval Bishop of Lichfield.

Æthelwald was consecrated in 818 and died in 830.

Citations

References

External links
 

9th-century English bishops
830 deaths
Anglo-Saxon bishops of Lichfield
Year of birth unknown
Place of birth unknown
Date of death unknown
Place of death unknown